Mark Allen Hunt (born January 23, 1960 in Charleston, West Virginia) is an American politician who is a Republican member of the West Virginia Senate, representing the 8th district. From 2012 to 2014, Hunt was a Democratic member of the West Virginia House of Delegates representing District 36 from 2012 to 2014. Hunt served consecutively from January 2009 until January 2013, and non-consecutively from January 1995 until January 2001 and from January 2005 until January 2007 in District 30 and District 31 seats. Hunt was a candidate for West Virginia Senate in 2000 and a candidate for the United States House of Representatives for West Virginia's 2nd congressional district in 2006.

Education
Hunt earned his BA from the University of Charleston, his MA from Marshall University, and his JD from the David A. Clarke School of Law at the University of the District of Columbia.

Elections
2012 Redistricted to District 36 with fellow District 30 incumbent Representatives Nancy Guthrie and Danny Wells, Hunt placed second in the seven-way May 8, 2012 Democratic Primary with 2,834 votes (20.4%), and placed first in the six-way three-position November 6, 2012 General election with 9,325 votes (19.7%) ahead of Representatives Wells (D) and Guthrie (D) and Republican nominees Robin Holstein, Stevie Thaxton, and Steve Sweeney.
1994 Hunt was initially elected in the District 31 Democratic Primary and the November 8, 1994 General election, and re-elected in the November 5, 1996 General election.
1998 Hunt was challenged in the three-way 1998 Democratic Primary, but won, and won the November 3, 1998 General election against Libertarian candidate John Sturgeon.
2000 To challenge Senate District 8 incumbent Republican Senator Vic Sprouse, Hunt ran in the 2000 Democratic Primary and won, but lost the November 7, 2000 General election to Senator Sprouse, who held the seat from 1997 until 2009.
2004 April 30 his third son Jackie  Lee Hunt was born. When District 30 Representative Foster ran for West Virginia Senate and left a district seat open, Hunt placed in the fourteen-way 2004 Democratic Primary and was elected in the fourteen-way seven-position November 2, 2004 General election which re-elected incumbents Jon Amores (D), Bonnie Brown (D), and Bobbie Hatfield (D), and nominees Corey Palumbo (D), Sharon Spencer (D), Danny Wells (D), and unseated Representative Calvert (R).
2006 To challenge West Virginia's 2nd Congressional District incumbent Republican United States Representative Shelley Moore Capito, Hunt ran in the 2006 Democratic Primary but lost to Mike Callaghan; Congresswoman Capito was re-elected in the November 7, 2006 General election.
2008 When Representative Palumbo ran for West Virginia Senate and Representative Amores retired, leaving two district seats open, Hunt placed fifth in the seventeen-way May 13, 2008 Democratic Primary with 10,512 votes (8.5%), and placed fifth in the fifteen-way seven-position November 4, 2008 General election with 21,635 votes (8.0%) behind Democratic nominee Doug Skaff and incumbent Representatives Wells, Brown (D), and Hatfield (D), and ahead of incumbents Spencer (D) and Guthrie (D), all seven Republican nominees and Mountain Party candidate John Welbourn.
2010 Hunt placed sixth in the thirteen-way May 11, 2010 Democratic Primary with 5,158 votes (10.0%), and placed sixth in the fourteen-way seven-position November 2, 2010 General election with 17,197 votes (7.8%) behind incumbent Representative Skaff (D), Republican nominee Eric Nelson, incumbents Wells (S), Hatfield (D), and Brown (D), and ahead of and incumbent Guthrie(D), unseated Representative Spencer (D) and the remaining Republican nominees.

Involvement with Clonaid
In 2001, the FDA discovered that the equipment in Raelian-founded Clonaid's human cloning lab in Nitro, West Virginia had been bought by Hunt, who wanted to clone his deceased 10-month-old son, Andrew. Hunt had spent $500,000 on efforts to clone his son. He enlisted Brigitte Boisselier, a French chemist and Raëlian religious leader, to run a secret cloning research lab in Nitro. Following an investigation, Hunt made an agreement with the FDA-OCI to not clone his son within the United States.

References

External links
Official page at the West Virginia Legislature
Campaign site

Mark Hunt at Ballotpedia
Mark Hunt at OpenSecrets

1960 births
Living people
David A. Clarke School of Law alumni
Marshall University alumni
Democratic Party members of the West Virginia House of Delegates
Politicians from Charleston, West Virginia
University of Charleston alumni
West Virginia lawyers
Democratic Party West Virginia state senators
Lawyers from Charleston, West Virginia